Samantha Katz (born October 14, 1985) is a creative director and curator best known for developing innovative community and technology based arts projects. She is the founder of Created Here, 
an online platform that empowers creators by bringing them together with local consumers and art enthusiasts, 
and the co-producer of the Created Here TV series, 
presently under development. Another notable project was Gallery Glass, a YouTube based series of interviews with artists employing the wearable technology Google Glass.

Education and early life 

Samantha Katz was born in New Haven, Connecticut and raised in Fairfield, Connecticut. She went to high school at Hamden Hall Country Day School in Hamden, Connecticut. Katz is a graduate of the Pratt Institute in Brooklyn, New York and did graduate coursework at Columbia University and New York University.  Her parents are Joette Katz and Philip Rubin.

Career and Projects 

Samantha Katz was formerly a Senior Art Director at Duarte,
the largest design firm in Silicon Valley. 
Prior to this, she was the Associate Creative Director at 
Sideways NYC
leading the digital design for client 
Arcade Creative Group, 
a Sony Music Entertainment company.

In parallel with her career in the design field, Katz has followed her passion for curatorial work and arts advocacy. 
She has worked in a consultative and directorial capacity with a wide variety of artists, art professionals, and vendors 
to produce contemporary art exhibitions and creative platforms that appeal to a range of audiences. 
From 2008-2011 she managed installations at Art Basel, Miami Beach, including the urban contemporary fair Graffiti Gone Global. 
Katz is the co-founder of REPUBLIC Worldwide (formerly, REPUBLIC Brooklyn), a Brooklyn-based art collective, and founder of Hello Good Design, an art and design consultancy. 
In 2013 she assumed the role of lead organizer of Arts in Bushwick, which hosts Bushwick Open Studios, New York City's largest open studio art event with over 600 local artists and galleries welcoming the public into their studios.
Katz has also written exhibition reviews and artist profiles for art publications 
Whitewall Magazine and 
Paper Magazine.

The  was the first art interview project using Google Glass and has received extensive media coverage, including: About.com Fine Art, Arte Fuse, Business Insider, DNAInfo New York, Native Underground., and other stories. Katz hosted a workshop for Google Glass at the 2013 TED Women's conference in San Francisco, where she spoke about this project and the intersection of art and technology.

Most recently, Katz launched Created Here, an online platform that features local artists and makers in various creative communities around the United States.

Recognition 

In March 2014 Brooklyn Magazine selected her as one of "The 100 Most Influential People in Brooklyn Culture," citing her work as co-organizer of Arts in Bushwick, 
and the Gallery Glass series. Brooklyn Magazine then interviewed Katz in 2015 about the past, present, and future of Brooklyn culture.

In April 2014 Katz and Peter Rynsky, her former boyfriend and then lead-singer of the pop band Darlings, were selected as one of "10 Bushwick Power Couples" by the Bushwick Daily.

References 

1985 births
Living people
Artists from New Haven, Connecticut
American art curators
American women curators
American designers
21st-century American businesspeople
Pratt Institute alumni
Hamden Hall Country Day School alumni
21st-century American women